Selling Live Water is a solo studio album by American hip hop artist Sole. It was released on Anticon in 2003. It peaked at number 126 on the CMJ Radio 200 chart, as well as number 7 on CMJ's Hip-Hop chart.

Production
Selling Live Water was produced by Telephone Jim Jesus, Alias, Odd Nosdam, and Jel. The album draws influence from Noam Chomsky and Howard Zinn. In an interview with Westword, Sole said, "Selling Live Water is an attempt at sizing up the world as I see it in a more complete manner than making vague self-absorbed rants like my last record, Bottle of Humans."

Critical reception

At Metacritic, which assigns a weighted average score out of 100 to reviews from mainstream critics, the album received an average score of 77, based on 9 reviews, indicating "generally favorable reviews".

Chris Dahlen of Pitchfork gave the album a 7.3 out of 10, saying: "Whether you dig it all or prefer him in small doses, Sole has never sounded more keyed up, heady and on target than he does on Selling Live Water, and its wrap-up is almost anthemic." Ed Howard of Stylus Magazine gave the album a grade of B−, saying: "Fun, diverse, and complex, this record is yet another great addition to the increasingly varied Anticon aesthetic." He added: "Encompassing personal introspection, socio-political commentary, naked explorations of relationships, and obtuse poetry, Selling Live Water also represents a massive step forward in Sole's lyrical evolution."

Track listing

Personnel
Credits adapted from liner notes.

 Sole – vocals, entaludes
 Telephone Jim Jesus – production (1, 15)
 Alex Oropexa – mixing (1, 2, 4–13, 15), extra keyboards (7, 9)
 Xopher D – mixing (1, 2, 4–13, 15), mastering
 Alias – production (2, 6, 7, 9–13)
 Why? – keyboards (3, 14), vocal harmonies (14)
 Odd Nosdam – production (3, 14), mixing (3, 14)
 Jel – production (5, 8), cuts

References

External links
 

2003 albums
Sole (hip hop artist) albums
Anticon albums
Albums produced by Alias (musician)
Albums produced by Jel (music producer)
Albums produced by Odd Nosdam